Hypsoblennius maculipinna is a species of combtooth blenny, which is found in the shallow coastal waters of the eastern Pacific from Costa Rica to Ecuador and which usually measures about .

References

maculipinna
Fish described in 1903